Daniel Mújica (born 21 November 1946) is a Mexican sailor. He competed at the 1968 Summer Olympics and the 1976 Summer Olympics.

References

External links
 

1946 births
Living people
Mexican male sailors (sport)
Olympic sailors of Mexico
Sailors at the 1968 Summer Olympics – Finn
Sailors at the 1976 Summer Olympics – Finn
Sportspeople from Veracruz
20th-century Mexican people